Caleb McDuff is a British go-kart racer. McDuff is profoundly deaf and uses cochlear implants to hear, but can not be use them while racing in a crash helmet.

McDuff currently races in the Super 1 National Kart Championships, driving for AllStars Racing Team, managed by Luke Hines.

Racing
 From an early age McDuff showed an interest in cars and racing, and learned to drive electric-powered cars from the age of 18 months. He had his first drive of a petrol-powered go-kart at age four.

In 2014 McDuff joined the Bambino Kart Tour, a race series created by Darren Beavers to encourage children aged six to eight to enter go-kart racing. The tour takes place at seven tracks around the United Kingdom during the course of the year. McDuff raced on a zip chassis, powered by a 50cc two-stroke engine which reaches speeds in excess of 40 mph, whilst racing in Bambino class. McDuff moved to Honda powered Zip chassis for the 2018 Super One British Championship.

Whilst racing, McDuff is unable to wear the processors for his cochlear implants that allow him to hear. This means that he races in complete silence, and this inspired the team name he races under of 'Silence Racing'. McDuff relies fully on sign language and lip reading once his processors are off, and has learnt to adapt other senses to compensate for this, and 'feels' the go-kart and its engine rather than hearing it.

In September 2014, McDuff received public nominations for Deaf Sports Personality of the Year (DSPY) 2014 (Young Player of the Year), and also Young Gun 2014 (under 13) by internet-based radio station DownForce UK.

In January 2018, McDuff joined the AllStars Racing team, managed by Luke Hines. Hines, a former racing driver himself, worked with McDuff to prepare him for the 2018 Super One Karting Championship.

In May 2019, McDuff became the first profoundly Deaf racing driver to step on the Super 1 National Championship podium,  after finishing 2nd at Rowrah, Cumbria. At the time, McDuff was driving for the same works Zipkart Team that four time Formula One World Champion Lewis Hamilton drove for during his karting career.

In October 2019, McDuff won the Super 1 National Kart Championships, making him first ever Deaf person to do so.

in 2020 McDuff returned to the Super One Championship, racing in the faster Rotax Max class. In the opening race of the Championship he was involved in a serious collision, causing him to have a dislocated shoulder and rib injuries. Despite missing a number of races whilst recovering, he still finished 3rd in the championship. In doing so, he also became the first ever Deaf driver to win a Super One Championship race.

Later in 2020 he went on to win the Super One annual 'O Plate' race in Cumbria, driving for the M-Sport racing team. Winning the O Plate was another first for a Deaf driver.

Sponsorship

In February 2015, British Touring Car team, WIX Racing announced McDuff as a member of their driver line up as part of a sponsorship program. UK-based oil company Millers Oils also announced their support of McDuff's career development. At the time of announcements, McDuff was the youngest deaf racing driver in the world on a professional career path.

McDuff is also sponsored by financial services comparison website Go Compare and house builders Taylor Wimpey, as well as several local businesses.

In September 2020, McDuff announced that due to the global financial crisis caused by the COVID-19 pandemic, he had lost all financial support from his sponsors.

References

External links
 

Sportspeople from Pontypool
Deaf sportspeople
2000s births
Living people
Welsh deaf people